Whey is a unit of weight for butter and cheese.

Definition 

Conversion 

1 Whey (Essex) ≡ 59/56 Barrel

1 Whey (Essex)  ≡ 236 pounds

1 Whey (Essex) ≡ 107.04779932 kg

See also
 Wey (unit)

References

Units of volume
Customary units of measurement